Chrysotimus delicatus is a species of longlegged fly in the family Dolichopodidae.

References

Further reading

External links

 

Peloropeodinae
Insects described in 1861
Taxa named by Hermann Loew